The 1999 Navarrese regional election was held on Sunday, 13 June 1999, to elect the 5th Parliament of the Chartered Community of Navarre. All 50 seats in the Parliament were up for election. The election was held simultaneously with regional elections in twelve other autonomous communities and local elections all throughout Spain, as well as the 1999 European Parliament election.

Overview

Electoral system
The Parliament of Navarre was the devolved, unicameral legislature of the Chartered Community of Navarre, having legislative power in regional matters as defined by the Spanish Constitution and the Reintegration and Enhancement of the Foral Regime of Navarre Law, as well as the ability to vote confidence in or withdraw it from a regional president.

Voting was on the basis of universal suffrage, which comprised all nationals over 18 years of age, registered in Navarre and in full enjoyment of their political rights. The 50 members of the Parliament of Navarre were elected using the D'Hondt method and a closed list proportional representation, with a threshold of three percent of valid votes—which included blank ballots—being applied regionally. Parties not reaching the threshold were not taken into consideration for seat distribution.

Election date
The term of the Parliament of Navarre expired four years after the date of its previous election, with elections to the Parliament being fixed for the fourth Sunday of May every four years. Legal amendments introduced in 1998 allowed for these to be held together with European Parliament elections, provided that they were scheduled for within a four month-timespan. The previous election was held on 28 May 1995, setting the election date for the Parliament concurrently with a European Parliament election on Sunday, 13 June 1999.

The Parliament of Navarre could not be dissolved before the date of expiry of parliament. In the event of an investiture process failing to elect a regional president within a two-month period from the first ballot, the candidate from the party with the highest number of seats was to be deemed automatically elected.

Parties and candidates
The electoral law allowed for parties and federations registered in the interior ministry, coalitions and groupings of electors to present lists of candidates. Parties and federations intending to form a coalition ahead of an election were required to inform the relevant Electoral Commission within ten days of the election call, whereas groupings of electors needed to secure the signature of at least one percent of the electorate in Navarre, disallowing electors from signing for more than one list of candidates.

Below is a list of the main parties and electoral alliances which contested the election:

Opinion polls
The table below lists voting intention estimates in reverse chronological order, showing the most recent first and using the dates when the survey fieldwork was done, as opposed to the date of publication. Where the fieldwork dates are unknown, the date of publication is given instead. The highest percentage figure in each polling survey is displayed with its background shaded in the leading party's colour. If a tie ensues, this is applied to the figures with the highest percentages. The "Lead" column on the right shows the percentage-point difference between the parties with the highest percentages in a poll. When available, seat projections determined by the polling organisations are displayed below (or in place of) the percentages in a smaller font; 26 seats were required for an absolute majority in the Parliament of Navarre.

Results

Aftermath
Investiture processes to elect the President of the Government of Navarre required for an absolute majority—more than half the votes cast—to be obtained in the first ballot. If unsuccessful, a new ballot would be held 48 hours later under the same majority requirement, with successive votes requiring only of a simple majority—more affirmative than negative votes—to succeed. If such majorities were not achieved, successive candidate proposals would be processed under the same procedure. In the event of the investiture process failing to elect a regional President within a two-month period from the first ballot, the candidate from the party with the highest number of seats was deemed to be automatically elected.

Notes

References
Opinion poll sources

Other

1999 in Navarre
Navarre
Regional elections in Navarre
June 1999 events in Europe